Cheshmeh Morad (also Romanized as Cheshmeh Morād and Chashmeh Morād) is a village in Dorunak Rural District, Zeydun District, Behbahan County, Khuzestan Province, Iran. At the 2006 census, its population was 277, in 68 families.

References 

Populated places in Behbahan County